Alan John Julian (born 11 March 1983) is a professional footballer who plays as a goalkeeper for National League South club Hampton & Richmond Borough.

Julian started his career at Brentford, progressing through the club's academy and making his first-team debut in 2002. After failing to secure a place as Brentford's number one goalkeeper, he left to join Stevenage Borough in February 2005. Julian played regularly during his time at Stevenage, helping the club win the FA Trophy in May 2007. He left Stevenage to join Gillingham on a free transfer in May 2008. Julian was released by Gillingham in May 2011, having played 80 games for the club during his three-year tenure. He spent a season at his former club, Stevenage, before being released in May 2012, and subsequently joined Newport County a month later. He then signed for Dartford for the 2013–14 campaign and was named as the club's Player of the Year that season.

After a brief spell at Conference South club Sutton United, Julian joined divisional rivals Bromley in January 2015. He helped Bromley achieve promotion to the National League in his first season with the club and spent the following two years playing regularly as the club consolidated their place in the top tier of non-League football. A move to Billericay Town of the Isthmian League Premier Division followed in February 2017. Julian played over 150 games during his three-and-a-half seasons at Billericay, helping the club to win promotion to the National League South. He signed for Hampton & Richmond Borough, also of the National League South, in September 2020.

Club career

Early career
Julian joined Brentford aged nine, following a successful trial. While also playing for Sunbury Manor and Sunbury Casuals, he progressed through the various youth ranks and eventually signed his first professional contract in 2002. He made his debut for the club in the Brentford's 1–0 victory over Plymouth Argyle in the Football League Trophy on 12 November 2002. During the match, Julian was "forced into numerous good saves. His best stop came in the 21st minute when he managed to claw away a stinging drive from Hasney Aljofree and moments later he also denied Blair Sturrock with a low block". He made a further three appearances during the 2002–03 season, keeping a clean sheet in a 1–0 win over Mansfield Town. At the end of the season, Julian signed a new contract with Brentford, keeping him contracted to the club until 2005. He made 14 appearances for Brentford during the 2003–04 season. Julian left Brentford in February 2005, claiming "the time had come" for him to experience first-team football on a regular basis.

Stevenage Borough
He signed for Stevenage Borough on a free transfer on 4 February 2005, making his debut in Stevenage's 1–0 win over Scarborough. Julian kept seven clean sheets for Stevenage in 17 appearances during the second half of the club's 2004–05 campaign, including in a 1–0 victory against Hereford United at Edgar Street in the play-off semi-final second leg – a win that meant Stevenage were one game away from reaching the Football League for the first time in their history. He played in the play-off final against Carlisle United at the Britannia Stadium, which Stevenage lost 1–0. He remained at Stevenage during the 2005–06 season, "attracting interest from scouts" as a result of Stevenage's strong start to the season. Stevenage kept 12 clean sheets during the season, although failed to make the play-offs following a 2–0 defeat at Forest Green Rovers, finishing sixth. Julian made 45 appearances for Stevenage during the campaign and was voted 'Supporters Association Player of the Year'.

At the end of the 2005–06 season, Graham Westley, the man that had brought Julian to Stevenage, left the club and was replaced by Mark Stimson. Stimson signed goalkeeper Danny Potter and stated that Potter would be the club's first choice goalkeeper. Julian was subsequently an unused substitute for Stevenage's first two games of the season. However, after Potter was sent-off in Stevenage's home game against Crawley Town, Julian made his first appearance of the season, coming on as a 63rd-minute substitute in a 3–2 defeat. Julian remained first choice goalkeeper from then onwards, making 53 appearances for the club during the 2006–07 season as Stevenage finished eighth in the Conference National. Eight of Julian's appearances during the season came in the club's successful FA Trophy campaign, keeping four clean sheets in the process. He also made a number vital saves in the club's semi-final second leg against Grays Athletic, which Stevenage went on to win by a 3–1 aggregate scoreline. Julian started in the Final, which Stevenage won 3–2 against Kidderminster Harriers at Wembley Stadium in front of a crowd of 53,262. The win meant that Julian was part of the first team to win a competitive final at the new stadium.

Julian remained at Stevenage for a fourth consecutive season, starting in the club's first game of the 2007–08 season, a 2–1 defeat at Crawley Town. He kept his first clean sheet of the season in Stevenage's 3–0 home win against Weymouth. This served as the catalyst for a run of eight games without conceding a goal, equalling a Conference National record when they beat Farsley Celtic 4–0 at Broadhall Way. Julian went a total of 778 minutes without conceding a goal. After manager Mark Stimson left Stevenage to join Gillingham, Julian refused to sign a new contract, stating he wanted to "keep his options open for the summer". As a result, he was transfer-listed in January 2008. Despite being on the transfer-list, Julian remained first choice goalkeeper under new manager Peter Taylor until Stevenage's 3–1 home defeat to Torquay United on 12 April 2008, his final appearance of the season. He made 44 appearances during the 2007–08 season. During his three and a half-year tenure at Stevenage, Julian made a total of 159 appearances in all competitions.

Gillingham
Julian joined Gillingham on a free transfer on 21 May 2008, joining up with former Stevenage manager Mark Stimson. He made his debut for Gillingham in the club's League Cup first round 1–0 home defeat against Colchester United on 12 August 2008. Four days later, Julian made his first league start for Gillingham, playing the whole match in a 1–0 home loss to Luton Town. He did not make another first-team appearance until November 2008, when he kept a clean sheet in a 1–0 away win at Macclesfield Town. A week later, he kept another clean sheet as Gillingham beat Bury 1–0 at Gigg Lane in the FA Cup. After six weeks without a first-team appearance, Julian played in Gillingham's 2–0 away loss at Dagenham & Redbridge. His next first-team appearance was five months later, playing in a 1–0 away victory at Rochdale, with Gillingham having already secured a play-off place. It was Julian's last appearance of the 2008–09 campaign as Gillingham secured promotion back to League One after a 1–0 play-off Final win against Shrewsbury Town. He made six appearances during his first season with the club, keeping three clean sheets.

Ahead of the 2009–10 campaign, manager Mark Stimson admitted he was undecided as to whether Julian or Simon Royce would start in the club's opening fixture of the season. Julian ultimately started in the club's 5–0 home win against Swindon Town on the first day of the season. After three straight defeats in the space of a week with Gillingham conceding seven goals, Julian was replaced by Royce ahead of the club's League Cup game against Blackburn Rovers. After the game, Julian only featured twice in the space of four months, both appearances coming in Football League Trophy fixtures. Julian handed in a transfer request in November 2009 as a result of a lack of first-team appearances. However, Gillingham received no offers for the player, with manager Mark Stimson saying "I haven't had a phone call. He's been on the loan circuit for four to six weeks and I haven't had a call. You don't just say I'm on the transfer list and six teams come in for you". He remained at Gillingham and after appearing in Gillingham's 2–1 away loss at Huddersfield Town in December 2009, Julian remained as a first choice goalkeeper until the end of the season. The club went the whole season without an away victory and were relegated back to League Two on the final day of the season following a 3–0 defeat to Wycombe Wanderers. Julian made 33 appearances during the 2009–10 season, keeping eight clean sheets.

Under the new management of Andy Hessenthaler, Julian started the 2010–11 season as first choice goalkeeper, starting in the club's first game of the season, a 1–1 draw with Cheltenham Town on 7 August 2010. However, similarly to the 2009–10 season, Julian lost his first-team place after a winless run at the start of the campaign. New signing Lance Cronin impressed in an away draw against Morecambe, and kept Julian out of the first-team for five weeks. After Gillingham's 7–4 away loss at Accrington Stanley, Julian regained his first-team place, playing in a 2–1 home win against Stockport County on 9 October 2010. Julian was part of the side that ended Gillingham's 35 game winless away streak when they won 1–0 against Oxford United at the Kassam Stadium on 20 November 2010, making a number of key saves during the game. He remained as first choice goalkeeper throughout the season as Gillingham finished in eighth position in League Two, narrowly missing out on a play-off place after losing three out of their last four games. Julian made 41 appearances for Gillingham in all competitions during the 2010–11 season, keeping 12 clean sheets. Despite being the club's first choice goalkeeper during the campaign, Julian was told that he no longer featured in the club's plans, and was subsequently released on 11 May 2011. He made 80 appearances in all competitions for Gillingham during the three years he spent at the club.

Return to Stevenage
In June 2011, Julian re-joined his former club, now renamed Stevenage, on a free transfer, three years after leaving the club. The move meant that Julian would be playing under the management of Graham Westley once more, who first brought Julian to Stevenage in 2005 – Westley said "Alan sees the opportunity in the long term and we all know how much quality he will bring into the squad. He is a different type of character but another man that you would happily go into the trenches with". On signing for Stevenage, Julian said "I had a great time at Stevenage before and coming back now and we are in League One, it is a dream come true". As a result of Chris Day dislocating his finger, Julian started in the club's first game of the 2011–12 campaign, keeping a clean sheet in Stevenage's 0–0 home draw against Exeter City. He played the first three games of the season, before first choice goalkeeper Chris Day returned from injury. Julian made just two further appearances during the campaign; in a 2–2 draw with AFC Wimbledon in the Football League Trophy, and an appearance as a second-half substitute in Stevenage's 2–2 home draw against Huddersfield Town. He was released by Stevenage when his contract expired in May 2012.

Newport County
In June 2012, Julian joined Conference Premier club Newport County on a free transfer. In Newport's first pre-season game ahead of the 2012–13 season, away to Caldicot Town, Julian suffered a knee ligament injury. He subsequently missed the first three months of the season, before eventually making his first-team debut for Newport on 17 November 2012, in a 3–1 home defeat to Hyde. Julian went on to make 11 appearances during a campaign in which Newport would return to the Football League after a 25-year absence following the club's 2–0 play-off final victory over Wrexham in May 2013.

Dartford
He was released by Newport at the end of the season, and subsequently signed for Dartford. On securing the signing of Julian, Dartford manager Tony Burman stated, "After meeting Alan a couple of times, I was impressed with his professionalism and I am looking forward to having someone of his experience here at Dartford." Julian was voted Dartford's player of the season for the 2013–14 season.

Sutton United
Following his departure from Dartford, Julian signed for Sutton United. However, following an injury in pre-season, Julian found opportunities limited, before eventually making 14 league appearances. He eventually left the club along with fellow goalkeeper Tom Lovelock in January 2015.

Bromley
Soon after, he joined Sutton's league rivals Bromley. He made his debut for the club in a 2–1 away win over Basingstoke Town.

Billericay Town
On 16 February 2017, Julian joined Billericay Town. On 19 October 2019, in an FA Cup fourth qualifying round match against his former club Sutton United, Julian scored an injury-time goal to earn his side a 1–1 draw and a replay.

International career
Julian is eligible to play for Northern Ireland due to his grandfather, John Julian Sr, being born in Belfast. After being capped at U18 and U19 level, he played once for the Northern Ireland U21 side, playing in a 0–0 draw against Switzerland U21 in August 2004.

Personal life 
Julian was born at Ashford Hospital. He is a Chelsea supporter.

Career statistics

International

Honours
Stevenage
 FA Trophy: 2006–07

Newport County
 Conference Premier play-offs: 2012–13

Bromley
 Conference South: 2014–15

Billericay Town
 Alan Turvey Trophy: 2016–17, 2017–18
 Isthmian League Premier Division: 2017–18
 Essex Senior Cup: 2017–18

Individual
 Stevenage Player of the Year: 2005–06
 Dartford Player of the Year: 2013–14
Isthmian League Premier Division Team of the Year: 2017–18

References

External links

1983 births
Living people
People from Ashford, Surrey
English footballers
Association footballers from Northern Ireland
Northern Ireland under-21 international footballers
Association football goalkeepers
Brentford F.C. players
Stevenage F.C. players
Gillingham F.C. players
Newport County A.F.C. players
Dartford F.C. players
Sutton United F.C. players
Bromley F.C. players
Billericay Town F.C. players
Hampton & Richmond Borough F.C. players
English Football League players
National League (English football) players
Northern Ireland youth international footballers
Footballers from Surrey